Canlan Ice Sports Arena is a multi-sport facility in Romeoville, Illinois. Their indoor rinks cans be used for ice hockey and figure skating The facility is located 45 miles west of Chicago.

In 2013, the arena became home to the Kane County Dawgs of the Continental Indoor Football League.

Facilities
The Canlan Ice Sports Arena offers
3 regulation-size hockey rinks.

References

External links
 

Indoor soccer venues in Illinois
Indoor ice hockey venues in Illinois
Indoor arenas in Illinois